Massimo Moriconi may refer to:

Massimo Moriconi (musician) (born 1955), Italian bassist
Massimo Moriconi (canoeist) (born 1956), Italian sprint canoer